Adamo Pedro Bronzoni (born February 23, 1985), is an Italian-Peruvian film and video editor and part-time producer based in Lima, Peru. He edits in a variety of styles within the documentary and fiction genres, and sometimes in other experimental forms. His works as an editor have won various prizes, including the Cinéfondation award at the 2012 Cannes Film Festival for the short film "The Hosts".

External links 

1985 births
Living people
People from Lima
Italian film editors